The Roman Catholic Diocese of São Mateus is a diocese located in the city of São Mateus in the ecclesiastical province of Vitória in Brazil.

History
 16 February 1958: Established as Diocese of São Mateus from the Diocese of Espírito Santo

Leadership
 Bishops of São Mateus (Roman rite)
 Bishop José Dalvit, M.C.C.I. (1959.05.09 – 1970.05.14)
 Bishop Aldo Gerna, M.C.C.I. (1971.05.18 – 2007.10.03)
 Bishop Zanoni Demettino Castro (2007.10.03 – 2014.12.03)
 Bishop Paulo Bosi Dal'Bó (2015.10.21 – present)

References
 GCatholic.org
 Catholic Hierarchy
 Diocese website (Portuguese)

Roman Catholic dioceses in Brazil
Christian organizations established in 1958
São Mateus, Roman Catholic Diocese of
Roman Catholic dioceses and prelatures established in the 20th century
1958 establishments in Brazil